The 1908–09 season was Manchester City F.C.'s 18th season of league football and 6th consecutive season in the top flight of English football.

In a season where they had almost the best home form in the league, only four teams won more games than them and only five teams scored more, City still finished 19th and became only the second team since the abolition of test matches eleven years earlier to be relegated on goal average - all of this arguably contributing to one of the earliest of the many bizarre circumstances in their history which has become known by supporters as "Typical City".

Team Kit

Football League First Division

Results summary

Reports

FA Cup

Squad statistics

Squad
Appearances for competitive matches only

Scorers

All

League

FA Cup

See also
Manchester City F.C. seasons

References

External links
Extensive Manchester City statistics site

1908-09
English football clubs 1908–09 season